Har Nebo Cemetery is a Jewish cemetery in the Oxford Circle neighborhood of Philadelphia, Pennsylvania.

Notable interments
 David Cohen, Philadelphia City Councilman
 Harry Gold (1910–1972), atomic spy
 Eddie Gottlieb (1898–1979), American professional basketball coach and team owner
 Samuel Gross (1891–1934), Medal of Honor recipient
 Stan Hochman (1928–2015), sportswriter

References

External links
 Jewish Genealogical and Archival Society, Cemetery Data
 
 

Cemeteries established in the 1890s
Cemeteries in Philadelphia
Jewish cemeteries in Pennsylvania
Jews and Judaism in Philadelphia
1890 establishments in Pennsylvania
Northeast Philadelphia